The Halloween solar storms were a series of solar storms involving solar flares and coronal mass ejections that occurred from mid-October to early November 2003, peaking around October 28–29. This series of storms generated the largest solar flare ever recorded by the GOES system, modeled as strong as X45 (initially estimated at X28 due to saturation of GOES' detectors).

Effects

On Earth
Satellite-based systems and communications were affected, aircraft were advised to avoid high altitudes near the polar regions, and a one-hour-long power outage occurred in Sweden as a result of the solar activity. Aurorae were observed at latitudes as far south as Texas and the Mediterranean countries of Europe. Twelve transformers in South Africa were disabled and had to be replaced, despite the country's low geomagnetic latitude.

On satellites and spacecraft
The SOHO satellite failed temporarily and the Advanced Composition Explorer (ACE) was damaged by the solar activity. Numerous other spacecraft were damaged or experienced downtime due to various issues. Some of them were intentionally put into safe mode in order to protect sensitive equipment. Astronauts aboard the International Space Station (ISS) had to stay inside the more shielded parts of the Russian Orbital Segment to protect themselves against the increased radiation levels.

Emissions from the CME were later observed by the Mars Odyssey spacecraft orbiting Mars, Ulysses spacecraft near Jupiter, and the Cassini spacecraft en-route to Saturn. In April 2004, Voyager 2 was also able to detect them as they reached the spacecraft.

Analysis

One of the solar storms was compared by some scientists in its intensity to the Carrington Event of 1859.

These events occurred during solar cycle 23, approximately three years after its peak in 2000, which was marked by another occurrence of solar activity known as the Bastille Day event.

See also
 List of solar storms

References

Geomagnetic storms
2003 in science
2003 natural disasters
Solar storm of 2003
October 2003 events